Habibollah Dahmardeh (Persian: حبیب الله دهمرده ; born 1952 in Zabol) is the governor of Sistan and Baluchestan, Lorestan and Kerman provinces and a member of the Islamic Parliament of Iran in the tenth and eleventh terms.
He holds a PhD in mathematics from University of Oxford and is a member of the faculty of Sistan University and a former advisor to the President of the Atomic Energy Organization of Iran.

References

External links
Official website

Iranian politicians
1952 births
Living people
People from Sistan and Baluchistan Province
Members of the 10th Islamic Consultative Assembly
Members of the 11th Islamic Consultative Assembly